Mesirow is a financial services company based in Chicago, Illinois. The firm is employee-owned. It provides investment management, capital markets, wealth management and investment banking services.

History
The company was founded in 1937 by Norman Mesirow.

References
 

Financial services companies of the United States
Companies based in Chicago